In Ontario, the Director of Education is an individual who has executive oversight and administration rights, usually within an educational entity or organization representing 72 District School Boards in Ontario of the anglophone and francophone publicly funded secular and separate school boards.

See also
Superintendent (education)
List of school districts in Ontario
List of high schools in Ontario
Education in Ontario

References